Elisandro Naressi Roos known as Santiago (or Elisandro in Hong Kong) (born 4 October 1976) is a Brazilian footballer.

Santiago spent most of his career (at least from 2005 onward) in Brazilian state leagues, and a brief spell in Hong Kong

Biography

Gaúcho and Catarinense
Born in Santiago, Rio Grande do Sul, Santiago spent his recent career in state competitions of Rio Grande do Sul (Gaúcho Leagues, Copa FGF) and nearby Santa Catarina state (Catarinense League).

He was the member of Guarani (of Venâncio Aires) at 2005 Campeonato Gaúcho. That season he did not score any goal and the team finished as the sixth (the last) of Group B.

In 2006, he was signed by SERC Brasil (of Farroupilha), for 2006 Campeonato Gaúcho Segunda Divisão.

In September 2006 he left for Inter de Lages, which the club finished as the fourth of Group B (total of 10 teams in 2 groups) of Campeonato Catarinense Divisão de Accesso (third division).

In 2007, he played for Santo Ângelo at 2007 Campeonato Gaúcho Segunda Divisão.

Hong Kong
In August 2007 he left for Hong Kong First Division League club Workable, which itself borrowed the licenses from "regional" team Shek Kip Mei (from Shek Kip Mei, an area/sub-district), the runner-up of 2006–07 Second Division. After goalless 11 appearances in senior competitions (including 10 starts in the first 10 round of the league), he was released.

return to Gaúcho lower leagues
He then played for Pelotas at 2008 Campeonato Gaúcho Segunda Divisão and São Paulo (RS) at 2008 Copa FGF. In February 2009 he returned to Pelotas and finished as the runner-up of 2009 Campeonato Gaúcho Segunda Divisão. He was released in September as the team did not participated in the cup. He briefly played for Grêmio Ibirubá which won 2009 Amateur League of Southern Brazil.

Cerâmica and Gaúcho cup
In February 2010 he signed a 1-year contract with Cerâmica of 2010 Campeonato Gaúcho Segunda Divisão. The team finished as the bottom of Group 6 (18 teams in stage two divided into 3 groups, Group 4 to 6) and was eliminated in the first round of 2010 Copa do Brasil. But the team finished as the runner-up of 2010 Copa FGF. He won 2010 Recopa Sul-Brasileira as unused member.

2011
In 2011, he was signed by Sapucaiense until the end of 2011 second division of the state. In June, he left for Gramadense, a team for the Amateur League of the state.

References

External links
 CBF Contract Record 
 

Brazilian footballers
Hong Kong First Division League players
Shek Kip Mei SA players
Esporte Clube Pelotas players
Sport Club São Paulo players
Cerâmica Atlético Clube players
Association football forwards
Brazilian expatriate footballers
Brazilian expatriate sportspeople in Hong Kong
Expatriate footballers in Hong Kong
Sportspeople from Rio Grande do Sul
1976 births
Living people
Esporte Clube Internacional de Lages players